Quảng Ngãi is a province in the South Central Coast region of Vietnam, on the coast of South China Sea. The province has been historically populated with H're people and ethnic Kinh, and located on the coast.

History
The ancient Sa Huỳnh culture inhabited what is now Quảng Ngãi. Remains of it were found in Sa Huỳnh, Đức Phổ District. Within Champa, the region that is now Quảng Ngãi was less significant than Quảng Nam province and Vijaya. There are only a few Cham remains in the province. The area became part of Vietnam along with Vijaya (Bình Định province) in 1471. In the early 19th century the Long Wall of Quảng Ngãi was constructed in the province. It improved security among the Vietnamese and H're people and facilitated trade. The province had become a center for religious activity, in particular with the construction of a mountain-top monastery, the Thien An Mountain Pagoda in 1695.  The mountain was designated by the ruler Nguyễn Phúc Chu and became a religious pilgrimage site.

Quảng Ngãi province was one of the first provinces in central Vietnam (together with Quảng Trị) to organize self-defense units in March 1945. The Ba Tơ Guerrilla Unit mobilized tens of thousands of peasants. It was known as a Việt Cộng stronghold during the Vietnam War and was the site of the purported Bình Hòa massacre and the My Lai Massacre. The province produced famous war literature on both sides of the conflict including the wartime diary of Viet Cong medic Đặng Thùy Trâm was written here, and from the US perspective, the setting of Tim O'Brien's The Things They Carried.

After reunification, the province was designated as the center of a planned oil industry notably the Dung Quất Refinery alongside special economic zones for the development of heavy and light industries.

Economy 
The economy of the province has historically relied on agriculture and fishing, but in recent years has seen significant industrialization with special trade rules applying. The economy of Quang Ngai and surrounding regions is designated for the development of heavy industries, in particular, trade-oriented export and special economic rules apply to parts of the province. The Dung Quat Economic Zone located within the province has a separate visa regime for foreigners seeking to work within the country.  Industrial output within the province has seen growth rates of 15-20% annually, far outstripping most other regions in central Vietnam.

The Dung Quat economic zone is recognized as one of five key coastal sites for economic growth in Vietnam, and has seen significant Japanese foreign direct investments.

Geography
Quảng Ngãi's topography is dominated by a large plain along the coast and in the center of the province and by mountains  and hills in the west and along its borders with  Quảng Nam and Bình Định provinces. Lowlands extend further inland along Trà Khúc River. The province's highest peak is at 1630m in the west of the province near the border to Quảng Nam. The coastline is relatively straight in most of the south and central part of the province (unusual for the South Central Coast), but features several capes north of Quảng Ngãi City. The province's largest river is the Trà Khúc. Other important rivers are the Trà Bồng in the north and the Ve River in the south of the province. The Lý Sơn islands belong to Quảng Ngãi.

Demography
The province had a population of 1,219,200 in 2009. Around 40% is concentrated in Quảng Ngãi City and the two districts just north and south of it (Sơn Tịnh and Tư Nghĩa), where population density ranges from over 500 to 3600/km2). Population density in most of coastal Quảng Ngãi is around 400/km2. The five western districts have population densities of less than 100/km2, three of them (Tây Trà, Sơn Tây, and Ba Tơ) even less than 50/km2. Quảng Ngãi is the least urbanized province of the South Central Coast, with only 14.4% of the population living in cities and towns. The population grew by an annual average of 1% between 2000 and 2007, while the growth of the urban population was 3.9% on average, one of the highest rates in the region.

The coastal lowlands are mostly ethnically homogeneous, with almost the entire population (>99%) made up of Kinh people. There are large Hrê communities in the southwest of the province. They made up the majority of the population in the districts of Ba Tơ, Sơn Hà (which then also included Sơn Tây), and Minh Long as of 1996. A slight majority in Trà Bồng District (which then also included the Tây Trà District) were Co people. There is also a small minority of Xơ Đăng in Sơn Hà District.

Administrative divisions
Quảng Ngãi is subdivided into 14 district-level sub-divisions:

 13 districts:

 Ba Tơ
 Bình Sơn
 Minh Long
 Mộ Đức
 Nghĩa Hành
 Sơn Hà
 Sơn Tây
 Sơn Tịnh
 Tây Trà
 Trà Bồng
 Tư Nghĩa
 Lý Sơn (island district)

 1 district-level town:
 Đức Phổ
 1 provincial city:
 Quảng Ngãi (capital)

They are further subdivided into nine commune-level towns (or townlets), 166 communes, and nine wards.

Economy
Quảng Ngãi's GDP per capita was 7.82 million VND in 2007, making it the second poorest province in the South Central Coast (after Ninh Thuận), due to weaknesses in all major sectors of the economy (agriculture, industry, services). However, Quảng Ngãi's economy has been booming since then, due to a spectacular increase in industrial GDP from the Dung Quat Economic Zone. It grew by 21% in 2009, increasing GDP per capita to 15.2 million VND, higher than that of its neighbours, Quảng Nam and Bình Định provinces. Exports increased from 31 million US$ in 2005 to 182 million in 2009.

The number of employed people increased from 571,400 in 2000 to 704,700, despite a significant decline agricultural and fishing employment. The booming industrial sector created 63,200 jobs in the period and employs 99,200 as of 2007. Despite lacking behind the industrial sector in terms of value-added, the service sector employed 180,500 people in 2007 compared to 57,900 in 2000.

Agriculture, forestry, fishing

Despite its large agricultural area, Quảng Ngãi's agricultural GDP is low compared to other provinces in the region. Rice cultivation takes up the largest area, concentrated around Quảng Ngãi City. 381,200t of rice were harvested in 2007. Other important crops include sugar-cane, peanuts, and coconuts. There is a large number of cattle in the province (287,800 in 2007), mostly in the northwest and southwest.

Quảng Ngãi's fishing output as share of total national output is larger than its population share  . Lý Sơn island plays an important role as an offshore fishing center. It contributed almost one fourth to the total of 126,000 tonnes of fish caught in 2012. However, in contrast to the rest of the region, there is a lack of rich fishing grounds off the coast of Quảng Ngãi province.

Industry
Quảng Ngãi City is a secondary industrial center of the South Central Coast with processing of agricultural products and production of some paper and machinery. Other products include beer (38.3 million litres in 2007), textiles (5,577 pieces), bricks (303 million), chemical fertilizer (24kt), and hand farming tools (352,000 pieces). Furniture is produced in Quảng Ngãi as a major export product, accounting for 11.475 million US$ in 2007.

Industrial GDP has more than tripled between 2000 and 2007, growing by an average yearly rate of 18.64%. This was the second highest growth rate in the South Central Coast after Bình Thuận province. Industry has grown even faster since then, due in large part to the Dung Quat Economic Zone. The Dung Quất Refinery, Vietnam's first oil refinery, started production in February 2009. In the same year, industrial gross output increased by 144.7% and the share of industry in the province's GDP surged from 36.2% in 2008 to 46.3% in 2009. This share is higher than that of other provinces in the region and even slightly higher than that of Đà Nẵng. The province's prospects for industry may also be changing outside Dung Quat Economic Zone. Vinatex bought Đại Cát Tường, a formerly bankrupt textile manufacturer, in 2011 and plans to expand its production in Quảng Ngãi significantly.

Quảng Ngãi's industry was dominated by the state sector (mostly centrally managed companies) until 2005, after which most of the state industry was (officially) privatized. The state sector's share decreased from 2/3 in 2000 to around 1/8 in 2007, while there was also a restructuring within the state sector from central state to locally managed state enterprises.

Infrastructure

Transport
National Route 1 and the North–South Railway run through the province. The main railway station is the Quảng Ngãi Railway Station. National Road 24 connects Quảng Ngãi to Kon Tum in the Central Highlands. It has its starting point at Thach Tru on National Route 1 28 km south of Quảng Ngãi City and passes through Ba Tơ District. The nearest airport is Chu Lai International Airport, just north of Quảng Ngãi province. The province has a major port in the Dung Quat Economic Zone, namely Dung Quat Port, in the north of the province. Sa Ky is a local port north of Quảng Ngãi City. It serves as a fishing and small cargo port and has regular ferry connections to Lý Sơn island.

Energy
There is a hydroelectric station on Trà Khúc River in the center of the province. It is located near the border of Sơn Hà District with Tư Nghĩa District and Sơn Tịnh District. As of 2007, 401 million kwh were generated in the province.

Tourism
Long Wall of Quảng Ngãi was discovered in 2005.

Disease outbreak
In April 2012, there have been multiple reports of an outbreak of an unknown fatal disease in the area around Ba Tơ. See Quảng Ngãi skin disease outbreak for more details.

References

External links

 
Quang Ngai Tourism on Facebook

 
Provinces of Vietnam